Reuben Lorenzo Snowe (September 28, 1866 – September 30, 1942) was an American educator and politician.

Biography
Born in Danforth, Maine, Snowe went to Lee Academy, Freyeburg Academy and Eastman Business College. Snowe taught school and was involved with The National Grange of the Order of Patrons of Husbandry. Snowe served as first selectman. In 1903 and 1904, Snowe served in the Maine House of Representatives, from West Gardiner, Maine, and was a Republican. Snowe died in a hospital in Gardiner, Maine.

Notes

1866 births
1942 deaths
People from West Gardiner, Maine
People from Washington County, Maine
Eastman Business College alumni
Educators from Maine
National Grange of the Order of Patrons of Husbandry
Republican Party members of the Maine House of Representatives